The Ovetari Chapel (Italian: Cappella Ovetari) is a chapel in the right arm of the Church of the Eremitani in Padua. It is renowned for a Renaissance fresco cycle by Andrea Mantegna and others, painted from 1448 to 1457. The cycle was destroyed by an Allied bombing in 1944: today, only two scenes and a few fragments survive, which have been restored in 2006. They are, however, known from black-and-white photographs.

History
Antonio Ovetari was a Padua notary who, at his death, left a large sum for the decoration of the family chapel in the Church of the Eremitani.  The project was carried out by his widow,  Imperatrice Ovetari, who, in 1448, commissioned the work to a group of artists, which included the elder Giovanni d'Alemagna,  Antonio Vivarini (a Venetian late Gothic painter) and  two young Paduans, Niccolò Pizzolo and Andrea Mantegna. The latter at the time was seventeen years old and had just begun his apprenticeship in Squarcione's workshop. According to the original agreement, the first two artists had to paint the arch with histories of the Passion of Christ (never executed), the cross vault and the right wall (Histories of St. Chrisopther) while the two Paduans would paint the rest, including the left wall (Histories of St. James, son of Zebedee) and the apse.

In 1449 there were the first personal problems between Mantegna and Pizzolo, the latter accusing the former of continuous interferences in the execution of the chapel's altarpiece. This led to a redistribution of the works among the artists; perhaps due to this Mantegna halted his work and visited Ferrara. In 1450 Giovanni, who had executed only the decorative festoons of the vault, died; the following year Vivarini also left the work, after he had completed four Evangelists in the vault. They were replaced by Bono da Ferrara and Ansuino da Forlì, whose style was influenced by that of Piero della Francesca. Mantegna began to work from the apse vault, where he placed three saints, mixed with the Doctors of the Church by Pizzolo. Later Mantegna likely moved to the lunette on the left wall, with the Vocation of Sts. James and John and the Preaching of St. James, completed within 1450, and then moved to the middle sector.

At the end of 1451 the works were halted due to lack of funds. They were restarted in November 1453 and completed in 1457. This second phase saw Mantegna alone at work, as Pizzolo had also died in 1453. Mantegna completed the Stories of St. James, frescoed the central wall with the Assumption of the Virgin and then completed the lower sector of the Stories of St. Cristopher begun by Bono da Ferrara and Ansuino da Forlì, where he painted two unified scenes: the Martyrdom of St. Christopher.

In 1457, Imperatrice Ovetari sued Mantegna, accusing him of having painted, in the Assumption, only eight apostles instead of twelve. Two painters from Milan, Pietro da Milano and Giovanni Storlato, were called in to solve the matter. They justified Mantegna's choice due to the lack of space.

Around 1880 two scenes, the Assumption and the Martyrdom of St. Christopher, were detached from the walls. During World War II the two frescoes were stored in a separate location, and were thus saved from the destruction of all the rest of the cycle during an Allied air bombardment of  11 March 1944. The destroyed scenes are  known today through black-and-white photographic reproductions.

Description

Architecture
The Chapel consists of an entrance room with a rectangular base, covered by a cross vault which is connected to a pentagonal apse introduced by an arch, where are a circular opening and four windows which illuminate the chapel.

Frescoes
The Chapel was dedicated to the saints James and Christopher. The two lateral walls were dedicated to the stories of each saint, with six episodes placed on three sections. The upper one consisted of a round lunette. Despite the presence of several painters in the work, the layout of the cycle is generally attributed to Mantegna, who devised  the architectural frames. The stories portrayed were inspired by Jacobus de Voragine's Golden Legend. 

The northern wall was entirely painted by Mantegna and included:
Vocation of the Saints James and John
St. James Preaching
St. James Baptizes Hermogenes
Judgement of St. James
Miracle of St. James
Martyrdom of St. James

The southern wall included the Stories of St. Christopher:
St. Christopher Leaving the King by  Ansuino da Forlì (attributed)
St. Christopher and the King of the Devils  by  Ansuino da Forlì (attributed)
St. Christopher Ferrying the Child by  Bono da Ferrara (signed)
St. Christopher Preaching by  Ansuino da Forlì (signed)
Martyrdom of St. Christopher  by Andrea Mantegna
Transportation of St. Christopher Beheaded Body by Andrea Mantegna.

On the central wall, where is the window, is a representation of the Assumption of the Virgin by  Mantegna. There are also further fragments, likely painted on the piers. The vault was decorated with Four Evangelists by  Antonio Vivarini between festoons by   Giovanni d'Alemagna, while the apse was divided into sectors, where Mantegna had frescoed the saints Peter, Paul and Christopher within a stone frame with fruit festoons. These figures show similarities with the frescoes by Andrea del Castagno in the Venetian Church of San Zaccaria (1442), both in the format and their sculptural firmness. Also similar is the cloud on which the figures are standing.

In the remaining spaces were the Eternal Father Blessing and the Doctors of the Church within frames, frescoed by Niccolò Pizzolo. The Doctors were majestic figures, the saints being portrayed as Humanist scholars at work in their studios. The arch had two big heads, usually identified as self-portraits by Mantegna and Pizzolo. The decoration of the Chapel was completed by an altarpiece in terracotta covered with bronze by Pizzolo, which, although very damaged, is still existing. It shows a Holy Conversation in bas-relief.

References

15th-century Roman Catholic church buildings in Italy
Roman Catholic chapels in Italy
Buildings and structures in Padua
Paintings by Andrea Mantegna
Paintings in Padua